Laure Colladant is a contemporary French fortepianist.

Biography 
After starting her musical training at Boulogne-sur-Mer in Charles Eloffe's class, Colladant continued at the Conservatoire of Paris, then at the École normale de musique de Paris with Lélia Gousseau and Lucile Bascourret.

She performs in France, Holland, Germany, Switzerland and Italy as well as in several piano festivals in Riom (1991 and 1998), in Perche, during the Promenade en pays d'Auge, at the Festival d'Ambronay, Musique dans le Grésivaudan…

She participates in several radio programs: on Radio France with Rémy Stricker and Anne Charlotte Rémond on Télérama and on Radio suisse romande, a broadcast on the fortepiano with the fortepiano maker and restorer, Johannes Carda.

In addition to the classical repertoire, she has created a work by Graciane Finzi, Univers de Lumière (1991) and Jacques Veyrier dedicated a work in the form of a suite for fortepiano to her in 2006.

She holds the title of  chevalier of the Ordre des Arts et des Lettres.

Discography 
 Albero, Sonatas for keyboard - Laure Colladant (pianoforte) Johannes Carda, after Anton Walter, Vienna 1790 (1993/1994, 2CD Mandala MAN 4841/42) 
 CPE Bach, Quatuors pour clavier, flûte, alto et violoncelle, Wq. 93, 94, 95 - Laure Colladant (fortepiano); Philippe Allain-Dupre (flute); Jean-Philippe Vasseur (viola); Antoine Ladrette (cello) (1996, Mandala 4922) 
 Benda, 3 sonatas for fortepiano (1993, Musicdisc/Accord) 
 Boëly, Trente caprices for fortepiano Op. 2 (4-8 September 1995, Adès) 
 Clementi, Sonatas for fortepiano Op. 7 n°3, Op. 8 n°1, Op. 25 n°2, Op. 34 n°2 (16-18 June 1999, Mandala MAN 4970) 
 Dussek, Duo pour harpe et piano-forte Op. 73; Sonata n°14 Op. 39 n°1; Sonata for harp; Grand duo for harp and fortepiano, Op. 72 n°1 - with Kyunghee Kim-Sutre, harp (1995, Mandala) 
 Mozart, Sonatas K.330, K.331, K.332, K.333 (17-18 April 1989, Adda) 
 Schubert, Sonata for piano D.960; Sonata D.894 - Laure Colladant (fortepiano) Filippo Molitor (1828) and Joseph Angst (1825) (2CD Intégral INT 221. 229/2)
 Woelfl (7CD Integral 221240/7, reissue of Mandala and Accord détaillés CDs below)
 Sonatas for fortepiano Op. 6 (27-29 June 1993, Adès/Accord 465 898-2) 
 Sonatas for fortepiano, Op. 15 (Accord 472 727-2)
 Trios for piano, violin and cello, Op. 23 – Vol. 1 - - Laure Colladant (fortepiano), Elisabeth Balmas (violin) (1996, Mandala 4887) 
 Sonatas for fortepiano Op. 28 – Vol.2 (November 1987, Adda 581036 / Mandala MAN4861) 
 Duos for fortepiano & harp, Op. 29, 33, 47 – vol. 3 - with Catherine Michel, harp (ADDA / Mandala) 
 Sonatas for fortepiano Op. 27, 54 (2000, Accord 465 846-2) 
 Sonatas for fortepiano Op. 33 (1995, Mandala MAN4860)

References

External links 
 Official website
 
 Laure Colladant on Art Mania

Living people
Year of birth missing (living people)
Place of birth missing (living people)
Conservatoire de Paris alumni
École Normale de Musique de Paris alumni
21st-century French women classical pianists
Fortepianists
French music educators
Chevaliers of the Ordre des Arts et des Lettres
Women music educators